Outlaws (French:Hors-la-loi) is a 1985 film by French director Robin Davis, starring Clovis Cornillac.

Cast
Clovis Cornillac ... Roland (as Clovis)
Wadeck Stanczak ... Christian
Nathalie Spilmont ... Ida
Isabelle Pasco ... Sissi
Pascal Librizzi ... Maxime
 ... Loulou
Joël Ferraty ... Néné
Philippe Chambon ... Eric
Didier Chambragne ... Alain
Steven Ronceau	... Milou
Luc Thuillier ... Rémi
Luis-Miguel Marques ... Bernard
Hatem Boussa ... Mehmet
Gilles Stassart ... Nehru
Kamel Meziti ... Mattouk

External links

French action drama films
1985 films
Films directed by Robin Davis
Films scored by Philippe Sarde
1980s French films